William Joe Drummond (born September 29, 1944, Oakland, California) is an American journalist.  He teaches at the UC Berkeley Graduate School of Journalism.

He graduated from the University of California, Berkeley with bachelor's degree, and from the Columbia University Graduate School of Journalism with a master's degree.
He was a White House Fellow in 1976. 
He was associate press secretary to President Jimmy Carter.
In 1977, he was a founding editor of “Morning Edition,” at NPR.

Awards
1986 Hillman Prize, Broadcast

References

External links
"Changing the Culture of the Academy: Toward a More Inclusive Practice", March 22, 2007

American male journalists
Journalists from California
1944 births
Writers from Oakland, California
Living people
University of California, Berkeley alumni
Columbia University Graduate School of Journalism alumni
University of California, Berkeley Graduate School of Journalism faculty
NPR personalities